The Campeonato Amazonense Segunda Divisão (English: Campeonato Amazonense Second Division) is the second tier of the football league of the state of Amazonas, Brazil.

Clubs
2021 Second Division

Associação Sport Club Atlético Amazonense
Centro de Desenvolvimento Comunitário Novo Aripuanã
Manauara Esporte Clube
Operário Esporte Clube
Atlético Rio Negro Clube
Sul América Esporte Clube
Esporte Clube Tarumã

List of champions

Amateur era

Professional era

Titles by team

References

External links
  
 Campeonato Amazonense Second Division at RSSSF

 
State football leagues in Brazil